This article contains a list of inventions by the Shakers, officially known as the United Society of Believers in Christ's Second Appearance. Founded in the 18th century, the Shakers, a celibate sect who lived a communal lifestyle, were known for their many innovative creations in varied fields including agriculture, furniture, housework, and medicine.

Architecture 
 Adjustable ventilating door transoms
 Round barn
 Sash-balance counterweight
 Shaker stairs

Food and agriculture 
 Apple parer and corer
 Automatic seed planter
 Condensed milk
 Fertilizer spreader
 Pea sheller
 Rotary harrow
 Shaker Lemon Pie
 Threshing machine

Furniture 
 Shaker pantry box
 Shaker tilting chair

Medicine and healthcare 
 Corbett's electrostatic machine
 Syrup of Sarsaparilla

Tools and appliances 
 Circular saw
 Peg-boards (often called "clothes-pins")
 Deacon Daniel Baird's machinery for making pails, wash boards, and shingles 
 Cut nails
 Flat broom
 Lumber-drying kiln
 No-kill mousetrap
 Metal pen
 Revolving oven
 Small paper packets for seeds
 Shaker broom vise
 Shaker spinning wheel
 Water-powered cooling fan
 Wheel-driven washing machine
 Wood-burning stove

References 

Inventions